Gosselekstantsiya is a rural locality (a settlement) and the administrative center of Belogorskoye Rural Settlement, Kamyshinsky District, Volgograd Oblast, Russia. The population was 883 as of 2010. There are 11 streets.

Geography 
Gosselekstantsiya is located in forest steppe, on the Volga Upland, 25 km southwest of Kamyshin (the district's administrative centre) by road. Popovka is the nearest rural locality.

References 

Rural localities in Kamyshinsky District